Binzhou University is a public university located in Binzhou, Shandong province, China. The university was established in 1958.

References

External links
Binzhou university 
Binzhou university 
Binzhou university 
Binzhou university 

Universities and colleges in Shandong